{{DISPLAYTITLE:C28H46O4}}
The molecular formula C28H46O4 (molar mass: 446.66 g/mol, exact mass: 446.3396 u) may refer to:

 Diisodecyl phthalate (DIDP)
 DPHP, or di(2-propylheptyl) phthalate